Roman Mory Diaman Gbane (born 25 December 2000), known as Mory Gbane, is an Ivorian professional footballer who plays for Russian club FC Khimki, on loan from Croatian club BSK Bijelo Brdo.

Club career
Gbane joined Russian Premier League club FC Khimki on a season-long loan on 15 July 2022. He made his RPL debut for Khimki on the same day in a game against the Russian champions FC Zenit Saint Petersburg.

Career statistics

References

External links
 
 
 

2000 births
People from Lacs District
Living people
Ivorian footballers
Association football midfielders
Stade d'Abidjan players
NK BSK Bijelo Brdo players
FC Khimki players
Ligue 2 (Ivory Coast) players
First Football League (Croatia) players
Russian Premier League players
Ivorian expatriate footballers
Expatriate footballers in Croatia
Ivorian expatriate sportspeople in Croatia
Expatriate footballers in Russia
Ivorian expatriate sportspeople in Russia